Glenford is a hamlet in Ulster County, New York, United States. Glenford has a post office with ZIP code 12433, which opened on September 14, 1886.

References

Hamlets in Ulster County, New York
Hamlets in New York (state)